Hans-Peter Keller (11 March 1915 – 11 May 1988) was a German poet who authored several poem collections, e.g. Auch Gold rostet (Even Gold Rusts) or Panoptikum aus dem Augenwinkel (Panopticum seen from the corner of the eye). In the 1960s Hans-Peter Keller was teacher for literature at the vocational school for librarians in Düsseldorf.

1915 births
1988 deaths
People from the Rhine Province
20th-century German poets
German male poets
German-language poets
20th-century German male writers